Robert Rhind was a Scottish amateur football inside forward who played in the Scottish League for Queen's Park.

Personal life 
Rhind served as a corporal in the Highland Light Infantry during the First World War.

Career statistics

References

Year of birth missing
Scottish footballers
Scottish Football League players
British Army personnel of World War I
Association football inside forwards
Queen's Park F.C. players
Highland Light Infantry soldiers
Place of death missing
Place of birth missing
Year of death missing
Third Lanark A.C. players